Wydawnictwo Dolnośląskie is a publishing company founded in 1986 with cooperation with Bertelsmann Media.

External links
 http://www.wd.wroc.pl/index.php?id=1
 http://www.google.com/search?num=100&hl=en&q=Wydawnictwa+dolnosl%C4%85skie+Bertelsmann 280k gh

Publishing companies of Germany
Publishing companies of Poland